Mads Brandt Pedersen (born 4 July 1996) is a Danish sprint and marathon canoeist.

He competed at the 2021 ICF Canoe Sprint World Championships, winning a bronze medal in the K-1 5000 m distance.

References

External links
 

1996 births
Living people
Danish male canoeists
ICF Canoe Sprint World Championships medalists in kayak
Competitors at the 2022 World Games
World Games gold medalists
World Games silver medalists
20th-century Danish people
21st-century Danish people